Haruka Tateishi (立石 晴香 Tateishi Haruka, born September 28, 1994 in Osaka Prefecture, Japan) is a Japanese actress and model who is currently represented by Hirata Office. She is well known for her role as Amu/Zyuoh Tiger in the 40th entry of the Super Sentai series, Doubutsu Sentai Zyuohger.

Biography
In 2007, Tateishi won the Grand Prix award in the 11th Model Audition for the Japanese magazine Nicola, aimed towards girls of young age. She subsequently began modeling for the magazine in the first October issue of the same year. She first got on the cover of the magazine in the September 2008 issue. Tateishi graduated from Nicola as a model in April 2011. She became an exclusive model of Seventeen from June 2011 onwards.

Tateishi graduated from Seventeen magazine in October 2013. She also left Ever Green Creative, her management company at the time, and announced her retirement from the entertainment industry. During retirement, she got a job at a general company and familiarized herself with the environment and gained experience from working with others.

In late 2015, it was announced that she came out of her retirement and was cast as Amu/Zyuoh Tiger in Doubutsu Sentai Zyuohger, the 40th entry of Toei Company's long running Super Sentai franchise. The season began airing in early February 2016.

In January 2022 she left Hirata Office. On the 8th of July 2022 she announced that she had signed up with the company "For You" as her new management.

Filmography

Magazines

Movies

Others

Dramas

Stage shows

Advertisements

Events

References

External links
 

Japanese female models
21st-century Japanese actresses
1994 births
Living people
People from Osaka Prefecture